The K-456 Tver, formerly known as K-456 Vilyuchinsk (ex Kasatka), is a Russian Oscar class SSGN of the Russian Navy. It was commissioned in 1991 as part of the Russian Northern Fleet and was transferred to the Russian Pacific Fleet in September 1993. The submarine is currently based at the Rybachiy Nuclear Submarine Base, in Vilyuchinsk, near Petropavlovsk-Kamchatsky.
Until 28 January 2011 it was called Vilyuchinsk, when the name was changed to Tver.

As of 2022, it's unclear if the submarine was at sea after its last exit in 2016.

References

External links
 deepstorm.ru // К-456 "Вилючинск", проект 949А
 Russia: Rybachiy Nuclear Submarine Base, Nuclear Threat Initiative
 Location and satellite photos of the submarine base: 

Oscar-class submarines
Ships built in the Soviet Union
1991 ships
Cold War submarines of the Soviet Union
Submarines of Russia